The Charleston Dirty Birds are an American professional baseball team based in Charleston, West Virginia. They are a member of the South Division of the Atlantic League of Professional Baseball, a partner league of Major League Baseball. The Dirty Birds have played their home games at GoMart Ballpark since 2005.

Team history

Before current era (1910–1983)
In , the Statesmen moved to the Class D Mountain State League, and then folded after that year. A new team, the Charleston Senators was formed in 1914 and lasted three seasons in the Class D Ohio State League. In , a new Senators team joined the Class C Mid-Atlantic League as an affiliate of the Cincinnati Reds. This team lasted until . In , the Senators were reformed as a member of the Class A Central League. In , the city was granted a franchise in the Triple-A American Association. At first, this team was affiliated with the Chicago White Sox, then the Detroit Tigers, and finally the Washington Senators. In , the Charleston Senators won the American Association championship. The franchise ceased operations after the  season.

In , the city had no team, but the Triple-A International League San Juan Marlins, affiliated with the St. Louis Cardinals, moved to the city but on May 19 the team was deemed not financially viable. In , the Charleston Indians, affiliated with the Cleveland Indians, moved to the city in the Class-A Eastern League, and in  that league was elevated to Double-A. The team folded after the  season.

The Charlies played in the International League from 1971 to 1983. The team had previously been the Columbus Jets. The Charlies were affiliated with the Pittsburgh Pirates, Houston Astros, Texas Rangers, and finally the Cleveland Indians. The Charlies left for Maine following the  season, and, after several moves, the team today is now known as the Scranton/Wilkes-Barre RailRiders.

Today, the Dirty Birds sell nostalgic "throwback" merchandise from the Pittsburgh-affiliated era of the Charlies, which is generally considered the pinnacle of baseball in the city.

Revival era (1987–2020)
In , the city resumed minor league baseball after a three-year absence. The new team was first called the Charleston Wheelers, so named for the city's history of stern- and side-wheeled boats. The Wheelers began as a co-op team, with players from several Major League Baseball franchises including the Los Angeles Dodgers, Detroit Tigers, Chicago White Sox, Chicago Cubs, Philadelphia Phillies, and Atlanta Braves.

In 1988, the franchise became the Chicago Cubs' third full-season Class A franchise (the other two being Peoria in the Midwest League and Winston-Salem in the Carolina League). The only two players on that 1988 squad to reach the Major Leagues were SS Alex Arias and C Matt Walbeck.

By that point, they had changed affiliation to the Cincinnati Reds. SAL Northern Division championships followed in 1991 and 1992, with the Wheelers losing the championship series both years.

In late , the Wheelers were purchased from then-owner Dennis Bastien by a conglomerate of local owners led by Charleston businessman Michael Paterno. The team changed its name to the Charleston Alley Cats in 1995 and switched colors from blue and green to red and black. Prior to the  season, they adopted the West Virginia Power name. To quote the team's announcement following their decision to change the team name:

West Virginia is and will continue to be recognized as one of the leading energy providers for the country. The energy production from coal, natural gas, and hydro-electric sources, combined with the fact that Charleston serves as the center for the state's political and economic powers led us to the name of the team. We felt it was extremely important that the name reflect the entire region and are excited about the tremendous marketing opportunities that will go along with the name.

The Power won the 2007 SAL Northern Division title, but lost in the league championship series to the Columbus Catfish in three-straight games.

2021 and beyond
In conjunction with Major League Baseball's reorganization of the minors after the 2020 season, the Mariners opted to discontinue their affiliation with West Virginia, leaving them in need of a new affiliate for 2021. It was later confirmed that the Power would be dropped from affiliated baseball, with the team stating its intent to continue playing for 2021 and beyond in another league.

On February 24, 2021, the team announced that it had been sold to a new ownership group led by Andy Shea, also owner of the Power's former South Atlantic League rivals the Lexington Legends. The Power joined the Legends in the Atlantic League of Professional Baseball, an independent MLB Partner league, for the 2021 season and beyond.

On September 28, 2021, the team officially changed their name to the Charleston Dirty Birds, a reference to the canary in a coal mine. Charleston won the second-half Southern Division championship, but fell short in the playoffs, losing to the eventual league champion Lexington Legends in the decisive third game of their playoff series.

Roster

Season-by-season records

Ballparks
The Alley Cats and their predecessors played in Watt Powell Park in the Kanawha City neighborhood of Charleston. Seating approximately 4,500 fans, Watt Powell Park was bordered by MacCorkle Avenue on the front (north) side, 35th Street on the east, and South Park Road on the west. On the south side of the park, a ridge of hills formed a natural boundary. Fans who would otherwise have had to pay to see the games periodically watched the action from a CSX railroad line hard up against the south wall of the stadium.

The Dirty Birds now play their home games in Appalachian Power Park at the east edge of downtown Charleston, a little more than a mile across the Kanawha River from the former site of Watt Powell Park. Most of the financing for the $25 million stadium came from the state, and the city, although the ownership team put up approximately $5 million. The original cost of the ballpark was supposed to be $20 million but cost overruns put the figure at $25 million. The city's share came mostly from the sale of Watt Powell Park to the nearby University of Charleston, which immediately sold two-thirds of the land to Charleston Area Medical Center, the region's largest hospital. Originally, the new park was to be completed for the 2004 season, but politically induced delays in securing state funds forced construction to be put off for a year. The new park opened in April 2005.

Notable Charleston/West Virginia alumni

Jeremy Affeldt
Ryan Braun
Lorenzo Cain
Rodolfo Castro
Tony Cogan
Carlos Corporán
Robinzon Díaz
Alcides Escobar
Yovani Gallardo
Mat Gamel
Jason Gilfillan
Jimmy Gobble
Trevor Hoffman
Norris Hopper
Hernán Iribarren
Matt LaPorta
Jason LaRue 
Starling Marte
Dave Parker
Gregory Polanco
Scott Pose
Pokey Reese
Alex Ríos
Julio Rodriguez
Ángel Salomé 
Jameson Taillon
Joe Thatcher
Mike Tonis
Dan Wilson

SAL records
Six Power home runs in one inning versus the Lexington Legends (South Atlantic League record)
Ten home runs in one game versus the Lexington Legends (Seven home runs by Power, also a SAL record)

References

External links 
 
 Statistics from Baseball-Reference

Atlantic League of Professional Baseball teams
Baseball teams established in 1987
Defunct South Atlantic League teams
Sports in Charleston, West Virginia
Professional baseball teams in West Virginia
Seattle Mariners minor league affiliates
Pittsburgh Pirates minor league affiliates
Milwaukee Brewers minor league affiliates
Toronto Blue Jays minor league affiliates
Kansas City Royals minor league affiliates
Cincinnati Reds minor league affiliates
Chicago Cubs minor league affiliates